The winners of the 1993–94 Asian Cup Winners' Cup, the association football competition run by the Asian Football Confederation, are listed below.

First round

|}
1 Al Nasr withdrew 
2 Sarawak withdrew

Second round

|}
1 New Radiant apparently qualified for quarter-final; reason unknown

Quarter-finals

|}
1 New Radiant withdrew

Semi-finals

|}
1 Nissan withdrew

Final

|}

First leg

Second leg

References
Stokkermans, Karel. "Asian Cup Winners Cup 1994". RSSSF.

Asian Cup Winners' Cup
2
2